Cho Yong-Chul (born May 7, 1961) is a South Korean judoka.

At the 1985 World Judo Championships in Seoul, Cho won a gold medal, beating double Olympic champion Hitoshi Saito by armlock submission in the final.

He won two Olympic bronze medals in the heavyweight division at the 1984 and 1988 Olympics.

External links
 

1961 births
Living people
Judoka at the 1984 Summer Olympics
Judoka at the 1988 Summer Olympics
Olympic judoka of South Korea
Olympic bronze medalists for South Korea
Olympic medalists in judo
Asian Games medalists in judo
Judoka at the 1986 Asian Games
South Korean male judoka
Medalists at the 1988 Summer Olympics
Medalists at the 1984 Summer Olympics
Asian Games silver medalists for South Korea
Medalists at the 1986 Asian Games
20th-century South Korean people
21st-century South Korean people